Women's Prison or Women's Prisons (French: Prisons de femmes) is a 1938 French drama film directed by Roger Richebé and starring Viviane Romance, Renée Saint-Cyr and Marguerite Deval. Based on the 1930 novel of the same title by Francis Carco, it was remade twice as the 1947 Swedish film Two Women and the 1958 French film Women's Prison.

It was made at the Neuilly Studios in Paris with scenes also shot at the Convent of the Ursulines in Montpellier. The film's sets were designed by the art director Roland Quignon. Along with another contemporary film Prison Without Bars it portrayed the female inhabitants with sympathy. Both films were successful at the box office. Despite its title, only a few scenes take place in prison and it mostly follows a character after she has been released from jail marries an industrialist and attempts to start a new life.

Cast

References

Bibliography 
 Crisp, Colin. French Cinema—A Critical Filmography: Volume 1, 1929–1939. Indiana University Press, 2015.
 Goble, Alan. The Complete Index to Literary Sources in Film. Walter de Gruyter, 1999.
 Larsson, Mariah & Marklund, Anders. Swedish Film: An Introduction and Reader. Nordic Academic Press, 2010.

External links 
 

1938 films
1938 drama films
French drama films
1930s French-language films
Films directed by Roger Richebé
French black-and-white films
Films set in Paris
Films based on French novels
1930s French films

fr:Prisons de femmes (film, 1938)